Samuela Ononono Fatafehi Tawake (born 11 September 1996) is a Fijian rugby union player, currently playing for Rugby United New York (RUNY) of Major League Rugby (MLR) in the United States. He also represents Fiji's national team. His preferred position is prop.

Professional career
Tawake signed for Major League Rugby side Rugby United New York ahead of the 2021 Major League Rugby season. Tawake made his debut for Fiji in the 2020 Autumn Nations Cup.

References

External links
itsrugby.co.uk Profile

1996 births
Living people
Fijian rugby union players
Fiji international rugby union players
Rugby union props
Canterbury rugby union players
Manawatu rugby union players
Rugby New York players
Fijian Drua players